The Akron Zips men's basketball team represents the University of Akron in Akron, Ohio. The team currently competes in the Mid-American Conference East division. The Zips are currently coached by John Groce. Prior to becoming members of the MAC in 1992, the Zips were members of the Ohio Valley Conference and the Mid-Continent Conference.

In 2008, the Zips officially announced they had signed a three-year partnership to be outfitted by the LeBron James line by Nike. They are now the only team with a LJ23/Nike contract. Nike has released several Zips themed versions of LeBron's shoes. Some are available to the public, while others are exclusively for the members of the basketball team.

The team first played in the NCAA tournament in 1986 when Bob Huggins was their coach. The Zips won their first MAC East division title in 1998. In 2006, the Zips received an invitation to the NIT and won their first post season game at Temple University before falling in the second round. In 2007, the team won their second MAC East title and tied the school record for wins in a season in the Division I era with 26. They also made their first appearance in the MAC Tournament Championship game, which they lost on a last-second shot 53–52 to the Miami RedHawks. The loss cost them the MAC's automatic berth and they were subsequently not selected for either the 2007 NCAA tournament or NIT, despite finishing with a 26–7 record. The Zips posted a 24–11 record (11–5 in the MAC) in 2008 which included a second-straight appearance in the MAC tournament championship game and a berth in the 2008 National Invitation Tournament.

History
The team was established in 1901, when the school was still known as Buchtel College, playing out of Crouse Gym, the school's original building, built in 1888.  They played their first game against Mount Union College, a 120–9 loss. The team played just four games in the 1901–1902 season, winning their final two against the Western Reserve College medical school.  The team's first three seasons were spent without the benefit of a head coach.  This changed with the arrival of the first head coach, Earl Williams, who would coach from 1904–1908.

Early history
Growing too big for Crouse, the team began playing at the Akron Armory, just a few blocks off-campus, in the 1920s. The Zips began play in the Ohio Athletic Conference in 1923 where they would compete from 1923–1965 except for 1936–1944 when the University left the OAC and competed as an independent.  In the OAC, Akron would win 8 conference titles and five tournament titles, three of them under legendary coach, Tony Laterza.  In 1954 the Zips moved into their own on-campus home, Memorial Hall, located to the east of Crouse Gym. 
After the 1965–1966 season Akron left the OAC for good and competed as an independent in the NCAA's College Division, which would later be renamed Division II.  When the NCAA divided into three divisions in 1973, the Zips would play one season in Division III before moving to Division II, where they would play from 1975–1980.  During the final three years as a Division II member, the Zips were part of an earlier Mid-Continent Conference for two years before joining the Ohio Valley Conference for the 1979–1980 season (though they did not play conference games until the 1980–1981 season), their last in Division II.
The Zips participated in the NCAA Division II tournament on seven different occasions, making the Division II Final Four three times (1964, 1966, and 1972) and reaching the championship game in 1964 and 1972, falling to Evansville and Roanoke, respectively.  Coach Laterza’s winning percentage at UA of .751 (178–59 from 1960–68) remains best in the history of the program.

 OAC regular-season titles: 1919, 1920, 1934, 1946, 1953, 1958, 1965, 1966
 OAC tournament titles: 1949, 1956, 1964, 1965, 1966
 NAIA tournament appearance: 1943
 NCAA Division II tournament appearances: 1958, 1964, 1965, 1966, 1967, 1971, 1972, 1975
 NCAA Division II Final Four: 1964, 1966, 1972
 NCAA Division II runner-up: 1964, 1972

Division I era
Akron attained NCAA Division I status in 1980 and began play in the Ohio Valley Conference that fall. In 1983, the Zips moved into their current arena, the James A. Rhodes Arena, just to the east of old Memorial Hall.  In 1984 Bob Huggins began coaching the team, leading the Zips to the 1986 OVC title and tournament title to gain their first berth in the NCAA Division I men's basketball tournament as a No. 15 seed, where they fell to the 5th-ranked and No. 2-seeded Michigan Wolverines 70–64 in the first round. Akron would play one more season in the OVC and earn a berth in the 1987 National Invitation Tournament before another stint as an independent from 1987–1990. Huggins would lead the Zips to the 1989 NIT before leaving Akron after the season to coach at Cincinnati. Akron would rejoin the Mid-Continent Conference in 1990 and compete for two seasons before officially beginning play in the Mid-American Conference in 1992. The Zips struggled early on as members of the MAC including a disastrous 0–18 MAC season in 1995–1996 which saw the Zips finish the season 3–23 overall on a 21-game losing streak after a 3–1 start.  Akron posted their first winning season in MAC play during the 1997–1998 season under coach Dan Hipsher going 13–5 and winning the first MAC East division title and qualifying for the MAC tournament for the first time. The Zips posted winning MAC records in 1998–1999 and 1999–2000 before struggling for several seasons, ultimately leading to the dismissal of Hipsher and the hiring of Keith Dambrot as head coach in 2004.

Keith Dambrot era
Dambrot had previously coached at nearby St. Vincent - St. Mary High School in Akron and had coached LeBron James.  Dambrot lead a resurgence in Zips basketball, posting a winning record (19–10, 11–7 MAC) in the 2004–2005 season, their first winning campaign since 2000, and a second MAC East division title in 2007.  Under Dambrot, the Zips have won 21 or more games in each of the last 12 seasons (beginning in 2005–2006) and have made ten postseason appearances: the 2009, 2011, and 2013 NCAA tournament, the 2006, 2008, 2012, 2016, and 2017 NIT, the 2010 CBI, and the 2014 CIT.  The 2006–2007 team tied the school record for wins, finishing 26–7, but failed to earn an invitation to any postseason tournament.  In 2007, the Zips advanced to the MAC tournament championship game for the first time in program history, losing on a last-second shot 53–52 to the Miami RedHawks at Quicken Loans Arena in Cleveland.  They made a second appearance in 2008, falling to arch-rival Kent State 74–55. Finally, in 2009, the Zips defeated Buffalo in the MAC Championship Game and advanced to their first NCAA tournament in 23 years, falling to Gonzaga in Round One. The Zips fell to Ohio in the 2010 MAC Championship Game, but returned to beat Kent State in the 2011 MAC Championship Game (their 5th consecutive appearance in the title game) to advance to the NCAA tournament for the 2nd time in 3 seasons.

MAC season records

* –Tournament Titles shaded in ██ dark gold. Regular-Season Titles shaded in ██ light gold. East Division Titles shaded in ██ light blue.

* – Overall record includes tournament/postseason results; Regular season conference record contained in parentheses.

* – † Indicates regular-season and tournament title.

MAC tournament
Since joining the MAC for the 1992–1993 season, the Zips have appeared in the last 23 conference tournaments, making their first appearance in 1998, the same year they won their first MAC East division title.  Since then they have posted a record of 30–19 in tournament play including consecutive appearances in the championship game between 2007–2013 for which is the current record for consecutive appearances. Additionally, they also hold the record for best winning percentage in the MAC Tournament at 0.612.

Postseason

NCAA tournament
The Zips have appeared in five NCAA tournaments their combined record is 0–5.

NIT
The Zips have appeared in seven National Invitation Tournaments.  Their combined record is 3–7.

Note: Beginning in 2006, the NIT began using a seeding and region system similar to what is used in the NCAA tournament.

CIT
The Zips have appeared in one CollegeInsider.com Postseason Tournament. Their record is 0–1.

Awards

MAC Awards

All-Americans

Individual career records

These records are up to date as of the 2014 season.

Notable alumni

International players

 Kwan Cheatham (born 1995), basketball player for Ironi Nes Ziona of the Israel Basketball Premier League
 Demetrius Treadwell (born 1991), basketball player in the Israel Basketball Premier League

References

External links